In Norse mythology, Meili (Old Norse: , "the lovely one") is a god, son of the god Odin and brother of the god Thor. Meili is attested in the Poetic Edda, compiled in the 13th century from earlier traditional sources, and the Prose Edda, written in the 13th century by Snorri Sturluson. Other than Meili's relation to Odin and Thor, no additional information is provided about the deity in either source.

Attestations
In the Poetic Edda poem Hárbarðsljóð, Meili receives a single mention; the god Thor declares that, even if he were an outlaw, he would reveal his name and his homeland, for he is the son of Odin, the brother of Meili, and the father of Magni.

Meili receives four mentions in the Prose Edda book Skáldskaparmál. In chapter 17, verses from the poem Haustlöng (attributed to the 10th century skald Þjóðólfr of Hvinir) are provided, where Thor is referred to as "Meili's brother." In chapter 22, additional quotes from Haustlöng are provided where a kenning is employed for the god Hœnir that refers to Meili ("step-Meili"). In chapter 23, a quote by a work from the skald Þjóðólfr of Hvinir is provided that refers to Thor as "Meili's brother". In chapter 75, Meili is listed among names of the Æsir and as a son of Odin (between the god Baldr and the god Víðarr).

Reception
Some 19th-century scholars proposed that Meili's mother should be understood as Jörð, a goddess and the personified Earth. Also during the 19th century, Viktor Rydberg theorized that Baldr and Meili are one and the same.

Notes

References

 Barth, Christian K. (1846). Teutschlands Urgeschichte, Vol. 5. Erlangen: J. J. Palm & Ernst Enke. 
 Faulkes, Anthony (Trans.) (1995). Edda. Everyman. 
 Larrington, Carolyne (Trans.) (1999). The Poetic Edda. Oxford World's Classics. 
 Pierer, Heinrich A. (1844). Universallexikon der Gegenwart und Vergangenheit, Vol. 21. Altenburg: H. A. Pierer. 
 Simek, Rudolf (2007) translated by Angela Hall. Dictionary of Northern Mythology. D.S. Brewer. 
 Rydberg, Viktor (2003). Our Father's Godsaga: Retold for the Young. Lincoln: iUniverse. 
 Uhland, Ludwig (1868). Schriften zur Geschichte der Dichtung und Sage, Vol. 6. Stuttgart: Verlag der J. G. Cotta'schen Buchhandlung. 

Æsir
Sons of Odin
Norse gods
Baldr